The following table shows the World Record Progression in the Women's 10 km Walk, as recognised by the IAAF.

World record progression

References
Athletix
IOC-site

Walk, 10 km women
Records